George Lakes  is a former Australian rules footballer who played with Melbourne and South Melbourne in the Victorian Football League (VFL).

Notes

External links 

1949 births
Living people
Australian rules footballers from New South Wales
Melbourne Football Club players
Sydney Swans players
Place of birth missing (living people)
West Broken Hill Football Club players